Saint-Bruno-de-Guigues, often shortened to Guigues, is a municipality in northwestern Quebec, Canada, in the Témiscamingue Regional County Municipality.

Demographics
Population trend:

 1991: 1069
 1996: 1117
 2001: 1129
 2006: 1076
 2011: 1100 (2006 to 2011 change: +2.2%)

Private dwellings occupied by usual residents: 449 (total dwellings: 540)

Mother tongue:
 English as first language: 0.9%
 French as first language: 99.1%
 English and French as first language: 0%
 Other as first language: 0%

See also
 List of municipalities in Quebec

References

Municipalities in Quebec
Incorporated places in Abitibi-Témiscamingue
Témiscamingue Regional County Municipality